Hesium is a genus of true bugs belonging to the family Cicadellidae.

The species of this genus are found in Europe.

Species:
 Hesium domino (Reuter, 1880)

References

Cicadellidae
Hemiptera genera